Lance Lalor is an American politician who served in the Texas House of Representatives from the 80th district from 1976 to 1980.

References

Living people
Democratic Party members of the Texas House of Representatives
Year of birth missing (living people)